Willshire may refer to:

People
William Willshire (–1851), British diplomat
William Willshire (policeman)  (1852–1925), first Australian police officer to be charged for murder
Willshire baronets, UK baronetcy

Places
 Willshire, Ohio, a village in the United States
Willshire Township, Van Wert County, Ohio, a township in the United States

See also
Wilshire (disambiguation)